Damschen is a surname. Notable people with the surname include:

Chuck Damschen (born 1955), American politician
David Damschen, American politician
Karl Damschen, (born 1942), German architect